The 2006–07 Ohio Bobcats women's basketball team represented Ohio University during the 2006–07 NCAA Division I women's basketball season. The Bobcats, led by first year head coach Sylvia Crawley, played their home games at the Convocation Center in Athens, Ohio as a member of the Mid-American Conference. They finished the season 18–12 and 10–6 in MAC play.

Preseason
The preseason poll was announced by the league office on October 24, 2006. Ohio was picked fourth in the MAC East.

Preseason women's basketball poll
(First place votes in parenthesis)

East Division
  (40) 245
  (1) 193
  136
 Ohio 115
  112
  60

West Division
  (21) 214
  (8) 188 
  996) 157
  (6) 142
  94
  66

Tournament Champion
Bowling Green (35), Kent State (2), Western Michigan (2), Toledo (1)

Preseason All-MAC

Schedule

|-
!colspan=9 style=| Non-conference regular season

|-

|-
!colspan=9 style=| MAC regular season

|-
!colspan=9 style=| MAC Tournament

|-

Awards and honors

All-MAC Awards

References

Ohio
Ohio Bobcats women's basketball seasons
Ohio Bobcats women's basketball
Ohio Bobcats women's basketball